Armands Zvirbulis (born 11 September 1987) is a Latvian freestyle wrestler. He qualified for 2012 Summer Olympics in London in the men's 84 kg freestyle division.  There he reached the quarterfinals, where he lost to Soslan Gattsiyev.  He was 5th at the 2011 World Championships. Zvirbulis has won European U-20 Championships in 2007.

References

External links 
 
 
 
 LOV profile 

1987 births
People from Gulbene
Latvian male sport wrestlers
Living people
Wrestlers at the 2012 Summer Olympics
Olympic wrestlers of Latvia
Wrestlers at the 2015 European Games
European Games competitors for Latvia